A Jacob's ladder (also magic tablets, Chinese blocks, and klick-klack toy) is a folk toy consisting of blocks of wood held together by strings or ribbons. When the ladder is held at one end, blocks appear to cascade down the strings. This effect is a visual illusion which is the result of one block after another flipping over. It may be considered a kinetic illusion, where the blocks appear to change position when they do not. Its name Jacob's Ladder comes from the biblical ladder to heaven, mentioned in Genesis 28:12.

Of unknown origin, the earliest known review of the Jacob's Ladder is an 1889 Scientific American article which tells how it is built and works:

Construction

An arrangement of interlaced ribbons allows each block to act as if hinged to the next one at either of its two ends. The same mechanism is used in the 1980s toy Rubik's Magic, but with plastic filaments run diagonally across squares, with the result that the squares can hinge along either of two adjacent sides.

Origin
The toy has been variously described as originating in China, as being found in Tutankhamun's tomb, and as one of the few toys allowed on Sunday by Puritans in colonial America, but the true origins of the toy are unknown.

Many slight variants have been patented in the United States, one from the 1940s having in one block an indentation to hold a penny, which then appeared to dis- and re-appear. The Japanese polymath Hiraga Gennai (1728–1780) constructed a Jacob's ladder which later came to be called "Gennai's Wondrous Click-clack" (Gennai no fushigina katakata, 源内の不思議なカタカタ).

See also
Chinese block
Jacob's ladder (string figure)
Rhombille tiling
Rubik's Cube

References

External links

"Toys, Tricks and Teasers: Kinetic Illusion Toys", Donald Simanek's Pages at lockhaven.edu.

Articles containing video clips
Traditional toys
Wooden toys
Novelty items